The International Exchange, now ICE Futures (since 2005-04-7), based in London, was one of the world's largest energy futures and options exchanges. Its flagship commodity, Brent Crude was a world benchmark for oil prices, but the exchange also handled futures contracts and options on fuel oil, natural gas, electricity (baseload and peakload), coal contracts and, as of 22 April 2005, carbon emission allowances with the European Climate Exchange (ECX).

The IPE was acquired by the Intercontinental Exchange in 2001. The IPE was an open outcry exchange until 7 April 2005, when its name was changed to ICE Futures and all trading was shifted onto an electronic trading platform.

History

Until the 1970s, the price of oil was relatively stable with production largely controlled by the biggest oil companies. During that decade two oil price shocks led to continued price volatility in the market; short-term physical markets evolved, and the need to hedge emerged.

A group of energy and futures companies founded the IPE in 1980, and the first contract, for gas oil futures, was launched the following year. In June 1988, the IPE launched Brent Crude futures.

Since its inception, oil futures and latterly options have been traded in pits on the trading floor using the open outcry system. As business volumes have grown, the IPE has moved location several times to accommodate new pits and more traders.

The Exchange has experienced incremental growth, year-on-year for most of its history. Complexity, but also efficiency have increased as new trading instruments such as swaps, futures, and options have been developed.

Contracts
Since 1997, the ICE Futures has expanded its offerings from Brent Crude and Gas Oil to include Natural Gas (1997), Electricity (2004), and ECX carbon financial instruments (2005). These expansions have allowed ICE Futures to offer a wider range of energy products. More advanced transactions are also now possible, due to cross- and multi-product transactions, which eliminate the need to use multiple markets or an adviser.

References

External links
ICE

See also

List of futures exchanges

Commodity exchanges in the United Kingdom
Energy exchanges
Economy of London
Petroleum economics
Petroleum organizations
Intercontinental Exchange
International organisations based in London